Baduiyeh-ye Olya (also Romanized as Bādūīyeh-ye ‘Olyā; also known as Bādūeeyeh-ye ‘Olyā) is a village in Dehaj Rural District, Dehaj District, Shahr-e Babak County, Kerman Province, Iran. At the 2006 census, its population was 169, in 42 families.

References 

Populated places in Shahr-e Babak County